Giovanni Alfonso Borelli (28 January 1608 – 31 December 1679) was a Renaissance Italian physiologist, physicist, and mathematician. He contributed to the modern principle of scientific investigation by continuing Galileo's practice of testing hypotheses against observation. Trained in mathematics, Borelli also made extensive studies of Jupiter's moons, the mechanics of animal locomotion and, in microscopy, of the constituents of blood. He also used microscopy to investigate the stomatal movement of plants, and undertook studies in medicine and geology. During his career, he enjoyed the patronage of Queen Christina of Sweden.

Biography
Giovanni Borelli was born on 28 January 1608 in the district of Castel Nuovo, in Naples. He was the son of Spanish infantryman Miguel Alfonso and a local woman named Laura Porello (alternately Porelli or Borelli.)

Borelli eventually traveled to Rome where he studied under Benedetto Castelli, matriculating in mathematics at Sapienza University of Rome. Sometime before 1640 he was appointed Professor of Mathematics at Messina. In the early 1640s, he met Galileo Galilei in Florence. While it is likely that they remained acquaintances, Galileo rejected considerations to nominate Borelli as head of Mathematics at the University of Pisa when he left the post himself. Borelli would attain this post in 1656. It was there that he first met the Italian anatomist Marcello Malpighi.

Borelli and Malpighi were both founder-members of the short-lived Accademia del Cimento, an Italian scientific academy founded in 1657. It was here that Borelli, piqued by Malpighi's own studies, began his first investigations into the science of animal movement, or biomechanics. This began an interest that would continue for the rest of his life, eventually earning him the title of the Father of Biomechanics. Borelli's involvement in the Accademia was temporary and the organization itself disbanded shortly after he left.

Borelli returned to Messina in 1668 but was quickly forced into exile for suspected involvement in political conspiracies. Here he first became acquainted with ex-Queen Christina of Sweden who had also been exiled to Rome for converting to Catholicism. Borelli lived the rest of his years in poverty, teaching basic mathematics at the school of the convent where he had been allowed to live. He never saw the publication of his masterwork, De Motu Animalium (On the Movement of Animals) as it was published posthumously, financed by Christina and his benefactors at the convent.

[[File:Borelli - Motu Animalium.jpg|thumb|left|350px|De Motu Animalium I'''s cover]]

Scientific achievements

Borelli's major scientific achievements are focused on his investigation into biomechanics.  This work originated with his studies of animals.  His publications, De Motu Animalium I and De Motu Animalium II, borrowing their title from the Aristotelian treatise, relate animals to machines and utilize mathematics to prove his theories.  The anatomists of the 17th century were the first to suggest the contractile movement of muscles.  Borelli, however, first suggested that 'muscles do not exercise vital movement otherwise than by contracting.'  He was also the first to deny corpuscular influence on the movements of muscles.  This was proven through his scientific experiments demonstrating that living muscles did not release corpuscles into the water when cut. Borelli also recognized that forward motion entailed the movement of a body's center of gravity forward, which was then followed by the swinging of its limbs in order to maintain balance.  His studies also extended beyond muscle and locomotion. In particular, he likened the action of the heart to that of a piston.  For this to work properly he derived the idea that the arteries have to be elastic. For these discoveries, Borelli is labeled as the father of modern biomechanics, and the American Society of Biomechanics uses the Borelli Award as its highest honor for research in the area.

Along with his work on biomechanics, Borelli also had interests in physics, specifically the orbits of the planets. Borelli believed that the planets were revolving as a result of three forces.  The first force involved the planets' desire to approach the sun.  The second force dictated that the planets were propelled to the side by impulses from sunlight, which is corporeal. Finally, the third force impelled the planets outward due to the sun's revolution.  The result of these forces is similar to a stone's orbit when tied on a string.  Borelli's measurements of the orbits of satellites of Jupiter are mentioned in Volume 3 of Newton's Principia.

Borelli is also considered to be the first man to consider a self-contained underwater breathing apparatus along with his early submarine design. The exhaled gas was cooled by sea water after passing through copper tubing. The helmet was brass with a glass window and 0.6 m (2 ft) in diameter. The apparatus was never likely to be used or tested.

 Other works 

Borelli also wrote:Delle cagioni delle febbri maligne della Sicilia negli anni 1647 e 1648 (Cosenza, 1649)Euclides Restitutus (Pisa, 1658)
Apollonii Pergaei Conicorum libri v., vi. et vii (Florence, 1661)Theoricae Mediceorum planetarum ex causis physicis deductae (Florence, 1666)
De vi percussionis (Bologna, 1667)
Meteorologia Aetnea (Reggio, 1669)
 
De motionibus naturalibus a gravitate pendentibus (Bologna, 1670)

References

Sources
Butterfield, H. (1950) The Origins of Modern Science. London: Bell and Sons Ltd.
Centore, F. (1970) Robert Hooke's Contributions to Mechanics. The Hague: Martinus Nijhoff.
Gillespie, C. ed. (1971) Dictionary of Scientific Biography. New York: Linda Hall Library.
Gribbin, J. (2002) The Scientists. Random House. 
Thurston, A. (1999) "Giovanni Borelli and the Study of Human Movement: An Historical Review", Aust. N. Z. J. Surg.'' Vol. 69.

Further reading

External links

 
 
  Gaedike, R.; Groll, E. K. & Taeger, A. 2012: Bibliography of the entomological literature from the beginning until 1863 : online database – version 1.0 – Senckenberg Deutsches Entomologisches Institut.

1608 births
1679 deaths
17th-century Neapolitan people
Italian Roman Catholics
Italian physiologists
17th-century Italian physicists
Italian entomologists
17th-century Italian mathematicians